Pargaon Sudrik is a panchayat village in the state of Maharashtra, India. Administratively, Pargaon Sudrik is under Shrigonda Taluka of Ahmednagar District in Maharashtra. There is only the single village of Pargaon sudrik  in the Pargaon sudrik gram panchayat.

The village of Pargaon sudrik  sits on the left  bank of the Saraswati River, and on the west bank of the sudrikeswar dam River. Three roads leave the village. To the east is the loni vyankanath  Road that connects to the south to State Highway 50 and to the north to State Highway 50. To the west there is the vadali road that passes through the villages of vadali belwani kothar. The other southern road goes to shrigonda is 7 km by north of the belwaandi railway station, There are much hotels and some lodges in the village.

The village consists of many tempal known as one of the sudrikeswar tempal

Villages in Ahmednagar district